The Shanghai-Taipei City Forum or Taipei-Shanghai City Forum is an annual forum between the government and civilians of Shanghai and Taipei.

History
The forum was initially proposed in 2001 by civilian group as a channel for exchange between the two cities, and eventually the forum was launched in 2010 by Taipei Mayor Hau Lung-pin.

Forum

See also 
 Cross-Strait relations

References

Cross-Strait relations